Yohannes Bahçecioğlu (born 26 February 1988) is a German former footballer who played as a midfielder.

References

External links
 
 Yohannes Bahçecioğlu on fupa.net

1988 births
Living people
Footballers from Cologne
German footballers
Turkish footballers
German people of Turkish descent
Association football midfielders
1. FC Köln II players
Rot-Weiß Oberhausen players
2. Bundesliga players
3. Liga players
Regionalliga players